Circe and Her Lovers in a Landscape is an oil painting by Dosso Dossi. It is dated to about 1525. The painting is in the collection of the National Gallery of Art in Washington, D.C.

Description 
The sorceress Circe is represented crowned with flowers, half sitting, half standing, to left beneath a group of trees, and nude except for green drapery that falls over her left leg; she points to a stone tablet of laws held with her left arm. Around are her lovers changed to birds and beasts, a greyhound, a white puppy, a stag with horns in the velvet, a hawk, an owl, two lions, and a spoonbill. Her familiar hind stands before her, and at her feet is an open book of spells. Wooded landscape and buildings to the left, against a horizon flushed with light and blue sky.

Analysis 

According to Robert Henry Benson, this is probably an early work painted under the inspiration of Giorgione and Titian. The same critic notes that the choice and treatment of the subject suggest a sense of humour in Dossi.

References

Sources 

 Benson, Robert Henry (1914). Catalogue of Italian Pictures at 16 South Street, Park Lane, London and Buckhurst in Sussex. London: Chiswick Press. pp. 115–116, no. 60.

Further reading 

 Cairns, Huntington; Walker, John, eds. (1944). Masterpieces of Painting from the National Gallery of Art. New York: Random House. pp. 72–73.
 Cairns, Huntington; Walker, John, eds. (1966). A Pageant of Painting from the National Gallery of Art. Vol. 1. New York: Macmillan. p. 164.
 Shapley, Fern Rusk (1968). Paintings from the Samuel H. Kress Collection: Italian Schools, XV–XVI Century. London: Phaidon Press. p. 73, fig. 176.
 Shapiro, Maurice L. (1974). "The Widener Orpheus". Studies in the History of Art, 6. pp. 24–25, 28.
 Walker, John (1963). National Gallery of Art, Washington, D.C.. New York: Harry N. Abrams, Inc. pp. 136, 140.
 "Circe and Her Lovers in a Landscape, c. 1525". National Gallery of Art. Retrieved 29 October 2022.

1520s paintings
Paintings by Dosso Dossi